My Heart Is a Drunken Compass is a 2014 memoir by Domingo Martinez. Martinez's motivation for writing this memoir was to use writing as a therapeutic outlet to cope with his feelings following accidents involving his brother and ex-fiancée.

References 

American memoirs
2014 non-fiction books
Lyons Press books